The 2001 Oregon State Beavers football team represented Oregon State University in the 2001 NCAA Division I-A football season. They were led by head coach Dennis Erickson.

Schedule

Roster

Rankings

Game summaries

New Mexico State

Arizona

References

Oregon State
Oregon State Beavers football seasons
Oregon State Beavers football